is a Japanese idol singer and actress formerly associated with Hello! Project. She joined in 2006 as a member of Hello Pro Egg, as a trainee. In 2007, she became a member of the Hello! Project futsal team Gatas Brilhantes H.P. and its musical group Ongaku Gatas. On March 29, 2008, she started a solo music career, working under the management and promotion of J.P Room. She continued with Hello! Project until 2013, and is now performing in solo music projects as well as acting in films and television.

Life and career

2008
Mano Erina joined Hello! Project as a Hello! Pro Egg in 2006 after passing the Up-Front Group "Egg" Audition. In 2007, she was one of the six members of the Hello! Pro Egg to be added to Ongaku Gatas and became a reserve player for the Gatas Brilhantes H.P. club. She graduated from Ongaku Gatas on March 2, 2008 and Hello! Pro Egg on March 29, 2008 to debut as a soloist. On June 29, 2008 she released her debut indie, "Manopiano". She has been featured as the opening act in various of her Senpai's concerts (Natsumi Abe, Morning Musume, Berryz Kobo and Cute), starting in August 2008.

2009
Having received piano lessons since kindergarten, Mano's solo work within Hello! Project prominently features her playing the piano parts of her musical releases and providing the vocal and piano parts of her songs while performing in concerts and at live events. In 2008, Mano released three singles under an independent label.

She has debuted under a major label Hachama with the single "Otome no Inori", released on March 18, 2009. It reached a number three position on the Oricon charts the first day of release and reached number five on the weekly chart. In 2009, Erina was announced as being one of the members of the new version of Pucchi Moni. Mano's songs are usually composed by KAN. Aya Matsuura has told her via a video comment in April 2009 that she "...needs to be the best singer in H!P, and in order to do that, she'll need to be a better singer than Ai Takahashi."

2010
Mano, along with S/mileage and Morning Musume will star in the CS-Fuji TV-TWO dorama Half Esper which will begin broadcasting in January 2010. Mano's role is a half-trained esper that left a secret government esper research organization known as Kokueken, without being able to fully control her supernatural powers.
In 2010 as well, the TBS drama Mano Spy will begin, where Mano plays herself, under the fictional premise that she's an undercover agent. She's sent to Japan as a spy for the Queen of the United Kingdom, and ends up passing an idol audition, so she has trouble with her espionage duties. The theme song of the show is "Matsuge no Saki ni Kimi ga Iru" (from Mano's first album). The show will begin streaming on the internet on January 26 and will be broadcast on BS-TBS on February 27.

She also was in a new drama called DEATH GAME PARK.

On July 1, 2010, Mano made her US debut in Los Angeles. Kai-Ki: Tales of Terror from Tokyo, a Japanese horror film in which she starred and had its world premiere at Club Nokia. She also had a short mini concert, a mini Q and A, and an autograph session for the fans who attended the event.

2011
In 2011, Mano Erina's radio show, "Mano-Deli", was replaced by Morning Musume 9th gen member Sayashi Riho's "Riho-Deli"
Also in 2011, it was announced that Mano would star in a short film called "Miyuki's Wind Bell".

In 2011 she had her another solo concert named, Mano Erina's Concert Tour 2011〜Hatachi no Otome 801DAYS.

In July she made a public appearance at South Korea to attend the Puchon International Fantastic Film which would film her movie.

2012
On April 18, it was announced that Mano, Yajima Maimi, Suzuki Airi, and Okai Chisato would star in a new stage play, Theatre In The Round. On November 30, it was announced that she would be joining the M-Line fanclub in March 2013.

2013
On February 19, it was announced she would star in TV Tokyo's drama Minna! ESPer Dayo!. On February 23, she released the photobook Mano na no and graduated from Hello! Project. On July 25, it was announced she would star in the drama Nijushi no Hitomi, which was her first prime time drama. On August 18, Mano appeared on the cover of the magazine Nini-Funi. On December 6, her manager announced that she would appear in a new drama, Shark, in January 2014. starring Johnnies Jr.

2014
In June 2014, Mano held her first concert since her graduation from Hello! Project1, titled "Again ~ Live House de Moetsukiyou!~".

Personal life
She married footballer Gaku Shibasaki on July 16, 2018.

Activities outside Japan
On July 1, 2010, she made her first promotional appearance outside Japan at Club Nokia in Los Angeles for her movie debut in Kai-Ki: Tales of Horror. Mano sang two songs before the screening and held a Q&A and autograph session for her fans. In July 2011, she made her second appearance outside Japan in South Korea.

Discography

Singles

Collaboration singles

Albums

Filmography

Television dramas

Television shows

Films
 Kamen Rider × Kamen Rider Fourze & OOO: Movie War Mega Max - Nadeshiko Misaki
 Waga Haha no Ki ~ Chronicle of My Mother (2012, as Sadayo the maid)
 Kamen Rider × Kamen Rider Wizard & Fourze: Movie War Ultimatum - Nadeshiko Misaki
 The Next Generation -Patlabor- (2014, 2015) as Akira Izumino
 Tag (2015) – Izumi 
 Orange (2015)
 Anonymous Noise (2017) as Miou Suguri
 The 100th Love with You (2017)
 Kids on the Slope (2018) as Yurika Fukahori
 Impossibility Defense (2018) as Yū Kimura
 We Are (2018) as Kana
 Bleach (2018) as Orihime Inoue

Awards

Japan Gold Disc Awards

|-
|rowspan=1| 2010
|rowspan=1| Erina Mano
| Best 5 New Artists
|

References

External links
  at Just-Pro 
 
 

1991 births
Living people
Japanese idols
People from Zama, Kanagawa
Hello! Project solo singers
Japanese women pop singers
Japanese child singers
Japanese mezzo-sopranos
Petitmoni members
Actresses from Kanagawa Prefecture
Musicians from Kanagawa Prefecture
Japanese film actresses
Japanese television actresses
Japanese voice actresses
21st-century Japanese actresses
21st-century Japanese singers
21st-century Japanese women singers
Japanese expatriates in Spain